Thomas Henry "Tom" Kellett (c. 1860 – November 2, 1907) was a railway agent and political figure in Manitoba. He represented Deloraine from 1892 to 1895 in the Legislative Assembly of Manitoba as a Conservative.

He was the first station agent for the Canadian Pacific Railway at Brandon, Manitoba and served for many years as station agent at Deloraine, where he also profited by speculating in land. In 1887, Kellett married Elizabeth Woodhouse. From 1895 to 1901, he was a grain broker. In 1901, he opened an employment office in Winnipeg.

He died at home in Winnipeg at the age of 47.

References 

Year of birth uncertain
1907 deaths
Progressive Conservative Party of Manitoba MLAs